Tim Mayotte was the defending champion.

Mayotte successfully defended his title, defeating John Fitzgerald, 4–6, 6–2, 6–2, 6–3 in the final.

Seeds

  Ivan Lendl (third round)
  Tim Mayotte (champion)
  Eliot Teltscher (second round)
  Eduardo Bengoechea (second round)
  Amos Mansdorf (second round)
  Christo van Rensburg (semifinals)
  Peter Lundgren (second round)
  Tomáš Šmíd (second round)
  Kevin Curren (quarterfinals)
  Kelly Evernden (second round)
  Paul Annacone (third round)
  Jim Pugh (third round)
  Mark Woodforde (second round)
  Dan Goldie (quarterfinals)
  Johan Kriek (third round)
  John Fitzgerald (final)

Draw

Finals

Top half

Section 1

Section 2

Bottom half

Section 3

Section 4

References

 Main Draw

U.S. Pro Indoor
1988 Grand Prix (tennis)